Mpho Matsi (born 7 February 1990 in Mamelodi) is a South African football player who last played as a defensive midfielder and midfielder for Stellenbosch in the Premier Soccer League.

References

External links

1990 births
Living people
People from Mamelodi
Sportspeople from Gauteng
South African soccer players
Association football defenders
Association football midfielders
University of Pretoria F.C. players
Mpumalanga Black Aces F.C. players
Cape Town City F.C. (2016) players
Maritzburg United F.C. players
Stellenbosch F.C. players
South African Premier Division players